Hugh Strachan (born 21 February 1939) is a Scottish former professional footballer, who played for Motherwell, Morton, Kilmarnock and Partick Thistle.

References 

1939 births
Living people
Footballers from Kilmarnock
Association football central defenders
Scottish footballers
Motherwell F.C. players
Greenock Morton F.C. players
Kilmarnock F.C. players
Partick Thistle F.C. players
Scottish Football League players
Cumnock Juniors F.C. players